"A Promise" is the fourth single by Echo & the Bunnymen and was released on 10 July 1981. It stayed on the UK Singles Chart for four weeks and peaked at number 49. Apart from the Australian-only release of "Over the Wall" later in the year, "A Promise" is the only single to have been released from the band's second album, Heaven Up Here (1981).

The b-side to both the 7" and 12" versions of the single is "Broke My Neck", which was recorded at Tistedal Studios in Tistedal, Norway on 7 June 1981. On the 7" disc, "Broke My Neck" is referred to as a "live" version but it is, in fact, an edit of the longer 12" studio version. The Belgian release of the 7" contains the extra track "Do It Clean", which had previously been the b-side of 1980's "The Puppet" and would again be a b-side on 1984's "The Killing Moon".

Track listings
All tracks written by Will Sergeant, Ian McCulloch, Les Pattinson, and Pete de Freitas.

UK 7" release (Korova KOW 15)
"A Promise" – 3:30
"Broke My Neck" (live) – 4:36

UK 12" release (Korova KOW 15T)
"A Promise" – 3:55
"Broke My Neck" (long version) – 7:11

Belgian 7" release (WEA 18.836)
"A Promise" – 3:30
"Do It Clean" – 2:45
"Broke My Neck" (live) – 4:36

Professional reviews
Allmusic  [ link]

Personnel

Musicians
Ian McCulloch – vocals, guitar
Will Sergeant – lead guitar
Les Pattinson – bass
Pete de Freitas – drums
David Balfe – keyboards ("Do It Clean")

Production
The Bunnymen – producer
Hugh Jones – producer
Bill Drummond – producer ("Do It Clean")
David Balfe – producer ("Do It Clean")
Claes Neeb – recorded by ("Broke My Neck")

References

1981 singles
Echo & the Bunnymen songs
Songs written by Ian McCulloch (singer)
Songs written by Will Sergeant
Songs written by Les Pattinson
Songs written by Pete de Freitas
Korova (record label) singles
1981 songs
Song recordings produced by Hugh Jones (producer)